Kulamangalam is a village in the North Madurai taluk of Madurai district, Tamil Nadu, India.

Demographics 
According to Census 2011 information the location code or village code of Kulamangalam village is 625017. Kulamangalam village is located in Madurai North Tehsil of Madurai district in Tamil Nadu, India. It is situated 15km away from sub-district headquarter Madurai North and 15km away from district headquarter Madurai. As per 2009 stats, Kulamangulam is the gram panchayat of Kulamangalam village.

References 
 

Villages in Madurai district